Archibald Scott Cleghorn (November 15, 1835 – November 1, 1910) was a Scottish businessman who married into the royal family of the Hawaiian Kingdom.

Biography 
He was born on November 15, 1835, in Edinburgh, Scotland, to Thomas Cleghorn and wife, Janet Nisbet, the second of two sons. In 1841 Thomas was Superintendent of the Government Domain (Auckland Domain) in Auckland, New Zealand. Janet Cleghorn died in Auckland in 1845.
In 1851, at the age of 16, Archie Cleghorn traveled with his father to Honolulu, where his father established a dry goods store. His father died within the year, but Archibald remained in Hawaii and continued running the store. His business prospered and he expanded to other islands.

Cleghorn became a citizen of the Hawaiian Kingdom in 1870.
He married Princess Miriam K. Likelike who was 19 years old, sister of David Kalākaua, on September 22, 1870, at Washington Place. In 1874 Kalākaua became King, and Cleghorn's daughter Princess Victoria Kaiʻulani was the heir to the throne of the House of Kalākaua.

In 1877, Cleghorn and Princess Likelike arranged to donate the land surrounding the monument to Captain James Cook on Kealakekua Bay marking the site of his death, in trust to the government of the United Kingdom.

Cleghorn served in the House of Nobles from 1873 to 1888, and the Privy Council from 1873 to 1891. He acted as the Royal Governor of Oʻahu in July 1887, and was appointed to succeed Prince Consort John Owen Dominis upon his death in November 1891, until February 28, 1893. He was the president of the Kapiʻolani Park Association since 1888, and first parks commissioner for the City & County of Honolulu in 1900. He served as a trustee of The Queen's Medical Center from 1905 to 1909.

Overthrow
Leading up to the 1893 overthrow, Cleghorn grew increasingly frustrated with Liliʻuokalani who he felt failed to see the seriousness of the political situation. He blamed Liliʻuokalani for not heeding his advice during the days leading up to the coup. In his diary, Cleghorn noted a British sympathizer had asked Liliʻuokalani to abdicate in favor of Kaʻiulani and he later wrote to his daughter that if the queen had abdicated on the night of 16th or the morning of the 17th, the monarchy would have been saved. 

On January 16, the day before the overthrow, he met privately with Thurston and requested his group respect Kaʻiulani's claim to throne and suggested installing her as queen with a board of regents as an alternative to overthrowing the monarchy. Thurston replied that the "matters have proceeded too far for your plan to be an adequate answer to this situation. We are going to abrogate the Monarchy entirely, and nothing can be done to stop us, so far as I can see!" Thurston noted that after their conversation Cleghorn looked as though he were about to cry and bowed his head in silence as he left. Historian Ralph Simpson Kuykendall noted that "Governor Cleghorn's meager diary for the early part of 1893 suggests the picture of an anguished father frantically trying to save his beloved daughter from the unhappy fate which had befallen her through no fault of her own."

Cleghorn took an oath of allegiance under protest to the Provisional Government of Hawaii led by Sanford B. Dole in order to retain his position as Collector General of Customs. He was ridiculed in the Hawaiian press for this move by Royalist Clarence W. Ashford. Cleghorn also helped the new government in enforcing the oath of allegiance with existing governmental employees at the custom house and signed his letter to his superior with "Your obedient servant". He later resigned on April 15 and was replaced by annexationist James Bicknell Castle.

ʻĀinahau and Stones of Kapaemahu 
In 1878 Cleghorn sold his residence in Honolulu and moved his family to ʻĀinahau, an estate in Waikiki built on land gifted by Princess Ruth Keʻelikōlani to his daughter Kaʻiulani.  There he built a two-story home and planted gardens with flowers and trees from all over the world, including the progenitor of all banyan trees in Hawai'i.    Cleghorn also purchase an adjacent beachfront lot on which was located a stone to which Likelike and Ka'iulani offered lei and prayers before bathing in the sea.  This was one of the Kapaemahu, large stones devoted to the four legendary māhū who brought the healing arts from Tahiti to Hawai'i.  Cleghorn's will stated that “the historical stones now upon the premises last above mentioned shall not be defaced or removed from said premises."

Death

Cleghorn died of a heart attack on November 1, 1910, at the ʻĀinahau royal estate. He was buried in the Kalākaua Crypt of the Royal Mausoleum of Hawaii.

His downtown Honolulu estate became the home of The Pacific Club in 1926.

Cleghorn willed the estate of ʻĀinahau to the Territory of Hawaii for a park to honor his daughter Ka‘iulani. However, the territorial legislature, reluctant to manage the property, used a specification that the park would have to close each night at 6:00PM as a technically to refuse the gift. The property was subsequently subdivided and sold with the Victorian mansion at ʻĀinahau becoming a hotel and then a rental property before it burned down on August 2, 1921.

Children 
Besides his daughter Kaʻiulani, Cleghorn had a number of children out of wedlock.

With a Hawaiian woman, Elizabeth “Lapeka” Kahalaunani Pauahi Grimes, Cleghorn had three daughters: Cleghorn and Lapeka later separated.

Rose Hilda Kaipuala Cleghorn (July 15, 1859 – February 27, 1911), on July 20, 1876 married James William Robertson (1852–1919), chamberlain to Kalākaua and Liliuokalani and founder of the Evening Bulletin newspaper that later merged with the Daily Star to become the Honolulu Star-Bulletin
Helen Caroline Maniʻiailehua (or Maunuilehua or Manuʻailehua) Cleghorn (December 17, 1863 – August 9, 1927), on August 16, 1888 married James Harbottle Boyd (1858–1915)
Annie Pauahi Cleghorn (July 28, 1868 – March 6, 1897), on December 20, 1890 married James Hay Wodehouse, Jr (1861–1913).

With another Hawaiian woman Annie Ana Makanui (died 1904):
Thomas Alexander Kaulaʻahi Cleghorn (March 11, 1899 – October 22, 1984), who married first Claire Rogers and later Nellie Yarnell Maxwell. He and his second wife adopted Melinda Lee Kaiulani as their adoptive granddaughter.

References

Bibliography

External links 

Mini Biographies of Scots and Scots Descendants Archibald Cleghorn

|-

1835 births
1910 deaths
Royalty of the Hawaiian Kingdom
Governors of Oahu
Hawaiian Kingdom politicians
Members of the Hawaiian Kingdom Privy Council
Members of the Hawaiian Kingdom House of Nobles
Burials at the Royal Mausoleum (Mauna ʻAla)
Recipients of the Royal Order of Kalākaua
Politicians from Edinburgh
19th-century American politicians
British expatriates in the Hawaiian Kingdom